is the first album by the Japanese girl group Team Syachihoko, released on August 20, 2014 on Warner Music Japan.

Release 
The single was released in 3 versions: "Kiku-ban" ("Listening Edition"), "Miru-ban" ("Watching Edition") and "Odoru-ban" ("Dancing Edition"). The latter two are limited pressings, while the Listening Edition has a limited first press edition with a special lower price ("Limited Himatsuburi Price Listening Edition").

Reception 
The album was nominated for the Grand Prix of the 7th CD Shop Awards.

Track listing 

The DVD that comes with the Limited "Miru" ("Watching") Edition contains a live recording of Team Syachihoko's concert titled "Tenchō Summit!!!: Arigatō o Tsutae Kirete Nakute" that was held on May 11, 2014 at Nakano Sun Plaza.

Charts

Awards

7th CD Shop Awards 

|-align="center"
|rowspan="2"| 2015
|rowspan="2"| Himatsubushi
| Grand Prix
|

References

External links 
 Album profiles at Warner Music Japan
Limited Himatsuburi Price "Listening Edition"
Limited "Watching Edition"
Limited "Dancing Edition"
 Videos for songs from the album
 
 
 

Team Syachihoko albums
2014 albums
Unborde albums